Kiesel may refer to:

 Kiesel (surname)
 Kiesel, California
 Kiesel Guitars, a guitar manufacturer
 The chemical element Silicon
 The chemical compound Silicon dioxide
 The mineral from silicon dioxide Quartz
 Unspecific chemical compounds of Silicic acid
 a widely distributed sediment, small stones (Kieselsteine), see Kies (disambiguation)